Guillermo Saavedra may refer to:
Guillermo Saavedra (footballer)
Guillermo Saavedra (poet)